= Calcutta Metropolitan Institute of Gerontology =

Indian non-profit organisation

- logo of CMIG
- Motto: Our strength is our commitment
- Type: voluntary organisation involved in research, publication, training, and service programs in gerontology.
- Established: 1988
- Founder: Ipsito Chakravarty
- Affiliations: University of Calcutta(Now no more affiliated)
- Location: Kolkata, West Bengal, India
- Campus: Urban
- Website: Official site

The Calcutta Metropolitan Institute of Gerontology (CMIG) is a non-profit, voluntary organisation involved in research, publication, training, and service programs in gerontology. It is located in Kolkata, India. It was established in 1988.

The aims and objectives of the institute are to provide a meaningful life to the elderly and to integrate them with the mainstream of the society.

The institute offers a one-year postgraduate diploma course in Gerontology and Age Management, in collaboration with the University of Calcutta. The institute has published many papers on gerontology.
